Chao'an is a district of Chaozhou City in eastern Guangdong Province. It was Chao'an County until June 2013, when it became a district of Chaozhou. The former county was known as 'Haiyang' until 1914.

It is under the jurisdiction of Chaozhou prefecture-level city.

Administrative divisions 
 Anbu
 Caitang
 Chifeng
 Dengtang
 Dongfeng
 Fenghuang 
 Fengtang
 Fengxi Town, Chaozhou
 Fuyang
 Guihu
 Guxiang
 Jiangdong
 Jinshi
 Longhu
 Shaxi
 Wanfeng Forestry
 Wenci

References

External links 
 Official website of the Chao'an County Government

Chaozhou
County-level divisions of Guangdong